Errikos Briolas (Athens, 19 October 1933 – 20 June 2018) was a Greek actor in theater, cinema, and television.

Briolas' family were motorists; Errikos followed the same profession and became a taxi driver until his second wife urged him to become an actor. He played in many Greek films roles, and due to his appearance and talent, became very popular. He later appeared in many theater performances. On television he starred in the series Ten Minutes (2000) and Time The Good (2004). From 1985 to 1990, he participated in 19 productions.

Briolas died on June 20, 2018 after a short hospital stay, during which he was particularly overworked.

References

1933 births
2018 deaths
Greek male film actors
Greek stage actors
Greek television actors

Male actors from Athens